Aplatissa strangoides is a species of moth of the family Hepialidae. It is endemic to Brazil.

References

External links
Hepialidae genera

Moths described in 1953
Hepialidae
Endemic fauna of Brazil
Moths of South America